, is a Japanese anime television series animated by AIC A.S.T.A, written by Hideyuki Kurata, and directed by Gorō Taniguchi.

Plot

The story is set on the "Planet of Endless Illusion", a place where rogues of all sorts gather. The protagonist, Van, travels the world searching for a man with a clawed right hand who killed his bride. He is joined by several other travelers along the way, each linked to the clawed man by a personal loss.

Media

Anime

The series aired on TV Tokyo from July 4 to December 26, 2005, totaling 26 episodes. The series was licensed for North America by Geneon Entertainment, who produced an English dub overseen by New Generation Pictures. The dub is also available in Australia from Madman Entertainment and in the United Kingdom by MVM Films. At Anime Central 2010, North American anime distributor Funimation announced that they have rescued Gun X Sword and re-released the series in late 2010.

Gun X Sword San
These are a series of 13 omake episodes of Gun Sword tied in very loosely to the plot with the characters as chibi puppets. The main characters are Wendy and her turtle, Kameo, the size of a human in this series and able to talk. Michael, Van and Carmen also appear voiced by their voice actors in the mainstream episodes. All the episodes seem to center around analyzing various events in Gun X Sword and mocking the themes displayed.

In the DVD volumes of Gun X Sword, there are 2 episodes tied into each volume in the extras with episode 13 on its own in the final one.

Game appearances
The series is included in the 2009 Super Robot Wars game, Super Robot Wars K, for the Nintendo DS, the 2019 game Super Robot Wars T for Nintendo Switch and PlayStation 4 and the 2021 game Super Robot Wars 30 for Nintendo Switch, PlayStation 4 and Microsoft Windows.

Notes

References

External links
 TV Tokyo's Gun x Sword website
 Gun X Sword - The Official Anime Website from FUNimation
 
 

Animax original programming
Anime International Company
Anime with original screenplays
Funimation
Geneon USA
Hideyuki Kurata
Anime and manga about revenge
TV Tokyo original programming
Mecha anime and manga